The House Tax Hartal of 1810–11 was an occasion of nonviolent resistance to protest a tax in parts of British India, with a particularly noteworthy example of hartal (a form of general strike) in the vicinity of Varanasi.

Background 
In 1810 the government attempted to extend a house tax that was in effect in Calcutta to other areas in Eastern India: Varinasi, Bengal, Bihar, and Odisha.

Inflation, crop failures, and widespread poverty made the tax especially difficult to bear.

Various non-governmental civil society groups in Varanasi met to decide on a course of opposition to the tax, and eventually decided on a hartal which included a general strike.

Hartal 

The strike was extraordinarily comprehensive. According to one commentator:
Everything was at a stand: the dead bodies were cast unceremoniously into the river, because there were none to perform the obsequial rites; and the very thieves refrained from the exercise of their vocation, although the shops and houses were left without protection…

The protesters gathered in a mass protest near the European occupation government authority buildings outside of town, and were joined by people from neighboring towns, in numbers variously estimated at more than two hundred thousand or between twenty and thirty thousand people. They presented a petition to the magistrate asking for the repeal of the tax. They explained this tactic in their petition thusly:
The manner and custom in this country, from time immemorial, is this: that, whenever any act affecting everyone generally, is committed by the Government, the poor, the aged, the infirm, the women, all forsake their families and their homes, expose themselves to the inclemency of the seasons and to other kinds of inconveniencies, and make known their affliction and distress, that the Government, which is more considerate than our parents, may observe their condition and extend indulgence to its subjects.

The tax collector commented on the nonviolent resistance strategy in this way:
At present open violence does not seem their aim, they seem rather to vaunt their security in being unarmed in that a military force would not use deadly weapons against such inoffensive foes. And in this confidence they collect and increase, knowing that the civil power cannot disperse them, and thinking that the military will not.

The protest began to flag, but was revitalized by government intransigence (it declared the protest assembly illegal on ). The protesters organized a march to Calcutta to present the Governor-General with their demands, but this petered out and they instead presented their petition through more ordinary bureaucratic channels.

Result 

The protest was successful in convincing the government to repeal the house tax. The following year, a more limited version of the tax was instituted in three cities, but the assessment and spending of the tax was placed in the hands of Indian representatives. That reformed tax did not provoke vigorous protests.

References

See also 
 
 

Civil disobedience
Protests in India
General strikes in the United Kingdom
General strikes in India